Zacharie Masimango Katanda is a Democratic Republic of the Congo Anglican bishop. He was consecrated as the 4th Primate and Archbishop of the Province of the Anglican Church of the Congo on 11 September 2016. He has been bishop of the Diocese of Kindu, since 1996. He is married to Naomi.

Ecclesiastical career
Katanda became the first bishop of the Diocese of Kindu, when it was created in 1996. A supporter of the Anglican realignment, he is involved with the Anglican Mission in the Americas. He was candidate to the offices of Primate and Archbishop of the Congo in 2014, against Henri Isingoma, receiving four votes against five for his opponent. After Isingoma announced his resignation in March 2014, he was once again candidate. He was elected the Primate and Archbishop of the Province of the Anglican Church of the Congo on 11 July 2016. Katanda installation took place at the Cathedral of St. Paul and St. Peter, in Kinshasa, on 11 September 2016. Former Archbishop of the Anglican Church of Tanzania, Donald Mtetemela, preached at the occasion. Among the attendants were also Archbishops Stanley Ntagali of Uganda and Thabo Makgoba, of Southern Africa, and bishop David Bryan, of the Anglican Church in North America. Katanda, like his predecessor, is a supporter of GAFCON and the Anglican realignment. From 2010-2014, he served as Governing Board member of the ACT Alliance.

References

Living people
Democratic Republic of the Congo Anglicans
20th-century Anglican bishops in Africa
21st-century Anglican bishops in Africa
21st-century Anglican archbishops
Year of birth missing (living people)
Anglican archbishops of the Congo
Anglican bishops of Kindu